The 1955–56 Michigan Wolverines men's ice hockey team represented the University of Michigan in college ice hockey. In its 12th year under head coach Vic Heyliger, the team compiled a 20–2–1 record, outscored opponents 109 to 49, and won the 1956 NCAA Division I Men's Ice Hockey Tournament.  The Wolverines defeated St. Lawrence 2–1 in overtime in the first round of the Frozen Four. They then defeated Michigan Tech by a 7–5 score in the championship game at Broadmoor Arena in Colorado Springs, Colorado. The 1956 championship was Michigan's sixth NCAA hockey championship in nine years.

Goalie Lorne Howes was selected as the team's Most Valuable Player and was also named Most Valuable Player in the 1956 NCAA Tournament.  Team captain Bill MacFarland was the team's leading scorer with 19 goals, 28 assists, and 47 total points in 23 games.  Howes, MacFarland, and defenseman Bob Schiller were all named to the All-American college hockey team.

Standings

Schedule
Conference games against Michigan State, Michigan Tech and Minnesota were only worth 1 point in the standings.

|-
!colspan=12 style=";" | Regular Season

|-
!colspan=12 style=";" |

Regular season

McGill: Dec. 3, 1955
On December 3, 1955, the Wolverines opened their season with a 5-3 victory over McGill in front of a sellout crowd of 3,700 at the Coliseum in Ann Arbor.  Dick Dunnigan scored two goals for Michigan.  Bill MacFarland, Ed Switzer, and Wally Maxwell scored one each. Team captain MacFarland sustained "a severe ankle sprain" after colliding with the boards in the third period. The Michigan Daily praised the play of the newest Wolverine, Wally Maxwell: "His scoring punch and sharp passing should make him one of Michigan's leading offense threats."

at North Dakota: December 9–10, 1955
The Wolverines next played a Friday/Saturday series against the North Dakota Fighting Sioux on December 9 and 10, 1955, at Grand Forks, North Dakota.  Michigan won the first game, 5-1, before a "violently partisan" crowd of 3,800 at Grand Forks.  Michigan's goals were scored by Dick Dunnigan, Ed Switzer, Tom Rendall, Jay Goold, and Wally Maxwell.  Goalie Lorne Howes made 23 saves.

The Wolverines lost the second game to North Dakota by a 4-2 score.  Michigan goalie Lorne Howes was struck by the puck above his left eye at the start of the third period and sustained a gash.  The game was delayed while Howes had the wound stitched. Ed Switzer and Bernie Hanna scored Michigan's goals.  South Dakota's final goal came late in the third period after Michigan coach Vic Heyliger pulled the goalie for an extra skater.

Denver: December 13 and 14, 1955
The Wolverines returned home for a Tuesday/Wednesday series against the Denver Pioneers on December 13 and 14, 1955.  In the Tuesday night game, the teams played to a 3-3 tie before a crowd of 2,500 at the Coliseum in Ann Arbor.  Michigan held a 3-1 lead with five minutes left in the game, but the Pioneers scored twice, including a tying goal with 49 second remaining.  Neither team scored in the 10-minute overtime period, and the game ended in a tie.  Wally Maxwell scored two goals in the game, and Ed Switzer scored one.  With the tie, Michigan fell to 1-1-1 in three WIHL games.

Michigan won the Wednesday night game by a 6-2 score in front of a crowd of 2,700 at the Coliseum. Defenseman Bob Pitts was the star of the game with two goals and a strong defensive performance.  Team captain Bill MacFarland also scored twice. Michigan's remaining goals were scored by Ed Switzer and Tom Rendall.  Denver's second goal came on an errant effort by Michigan to clear the zone.  A Michigan defender inadvertently passed the puck backward into the net. After the game, Michigan coach Vic Heyliger said, "When these boys want to play hockey, they can really get out there and play.  This is what we've been waiting for."

Ineligible Players
On February 7 the Big Ten ruled that Mike Buchanan and Wally Maxwell were ineligible to play due to having accepted expense money from outside sources while playing in high school. While the ruling ended the college careers of both players, no action was taken against Michigan as the violations occurred prior to either player entering college. Furthermore, Michigan was not required to forfeit any games in which either player had participated (including the 1955 national championship in which Buchanan had played).

1956 NCAA championship
After compiling an 18–2–1 record and winning the Western Intercollegiate Hockey League (WIHL) championship, Michigan was invited to participate in the Frozen Four for the ninth consecutive year.  The 1956 NCAA Division I Men's Ice Hockey Tournament was held at Broadmoor Arena at The Broadmoor, a luxury hotel located in Colorado Springs, Colorado.  St. Lawrence University (from Canton, New York) and Boston College were invited from the East and Michigan and Michigan Technological University (from Houghton, Michigan) were invited from the West.

Semifinal vs. St. Lawrence
On March 16, 1956, the Wolverines faced the St. Lawrence Saints in the opening round.  Neither team scored in the first period, as Michigan goalie Lorne Howes made 11 saves and the Wolverines were held to five shots on goal.  St. Lawrence took a 1–0 lead with an unassisted goal by McKinnon with less than a minute remaining in the second period.  St. Lawrence goalie Whittier had 15 saves in the second period.  At the 3:59 mark in the third period, Michigan tied the score at 1–1 as Ed Switzer scored a goal with assists by Neil McDonald and Bob Pitts.  Howes made 13 saves in the third period (30 saves in the game), and the third period ended in a tie.  In the overtime period, Tom Rendall scored the winning goal at the 1:21 mark with an assist from Don McIntosh.

Championship vs. Michigan Tech.
On March 17, 1956, the Wolverines faced the Michigan Tech Huskies in the championship game.  The Wolverines and Huskies had played four times in the regular season with Michigan winning all four games by a combined score of 21–7.  In the championship game, Michigan struck first with a goal by Ed Switzer, assisted by Neil McDonald, only 23 seconds into the game.  The period ended with Michigan ahead 4–3.  Michigan's remaining goals in the first period were scored by Neil McDonald (assist by Bob Schiller at 9:22), Aubrey (unassisted at 11:04), and Schiller (assist by McDonald at 13:11).  Michigan goalie Lorne Howes made 19 saves in the first period.  In the second period, Michigan Tech took a 5–4 lead, scoring two goals in the opening 7:15. The Wolverines tied the score at 5–5 on a goal by Ed Switzer, assisted by Bernie Hanna at 7:58.  Michigan then took the lead, scoring two goals within 11 seconds of the other.  Switzer scored at the 14:38 mark (assist by Dick Dunnigan), and Neil McDonald followed with an unassisted goal at 14:49.  The third period was scoreless as Howes tallied 19 more saves.  Switzer's third goal of the game gave him a hat trick.

(W1) Michigan vs. (W2) Michigan Tech

All-Tournament Team
Michigan goalie Lorne Howes, who totaled 46 saves in the championship game, was named the Most Outstanding Player of the Tournament.  Michigan players also took five of six first-team spots on the Associated Press All-Tournament Team. The Michigan players so honored were Howes, defensemen Bob Pitts and Bob Schiller, center Tom Rendall, and wing Ed Switzer.  Shortly after winning the championship, the members of the Michigan hockey team selected Bob Pitts as captain of the 1956–57 Michigan hockey team.

Roster and scoring statistics
Fourteen players received varsity letters for the 1955–56 Michigan hockey team.  Those 14 players are listed in bold below.  Richard T. Brown received the Manager's "M".

See also
1956 NCAA Division I Men's Ice Hockey Tournament
List of NCAA Division I Men's Ice Hockey Tournament champions

References

Michigan Wolverines men's ice hockey seasons
Michigan
Michigan
Michigan
Michigan